Ksibet  is a town and commune in the Sousse Governorate, Tunisia. As of 2014 it had a population of 11,623.

See also
List of cities in Tunisia

References

Populated places in Tunisia
Communes of Tunisia
Tunisia geography articles needing translation from French Wikipedia